Salman bin Abdulaziz Mosque is a proposed grand mosque approved by King Salman bin Abdulaziz. It will be constructed in the H-10 sector Islamabad.

The mosque will accommodate 6,000 people, 2,000 for special prayers for women. The project will also include the Custodian of the Two Holy Mosques Library, Museum, Muhammad Bin Salman Conference Hall, Office Services Zone and Parking Area.

References

Proposed mosques
Mosques in Pakistan
2021 establishments in Pakistan
Mosques in Islamabad
Pakistan–Saudi Arabia relations
21st-century mosques